The 2011 Ohio Valley Conference men's basketball tournament occurred March 2, 3, 4, and 5. All tournament games took place at Nashville Municipal Auditorium in Nashville, Tennessee.

Format
The format for the tournament was changed, beginning with the 2011 tournament. Seeding changed to a merit-based system where the No. 1 and 2 seeds receive a double bye to the semifinals while the No. 3 and 4 seeds get a single bye to the quarterfinals (a system that has been used since 2003 in the West Coast Conference). The first round will match up the No. 5/8 and No. 6/7 seeds. The top eight eligible men's basketball teams in the Ohio Valley Conference receive a berth in the conference tournament.  After the 18-game conference season, teams were seeded by conference record.  The winner earned an automatic berth in the 2011 NCAA tournament.

Seeds
Only eight Ohio Valley schools qualified for the tournament.  Teams were seeded by 2010–11 Ohio Valley Conference record, with a tiebreaker system to seed teams with identical conference records.

Through games of Feb. 26, 2011, the seeds are as follows after implementing tiebreakers:

Bracket

Outcome

Morehead St. defeated Tennessee Tech, 80–73 in the final of the Ohio Valley Conference tournament in Nashville. They moved on to their second NCAA tournament in the past three years and fourth overall. In the tournament, they upset Louisville in the first round before losing to Richmond in the second round. The favorite to face Morehead St. in the finals was the #1 seed and their top rival, Murray St., but they lost to Tennessee Tech in semifinals, 64–59.

References

External links
Official site of the Ohio Valley Conference
Official site of the Ohio Valley Conference tournament
Tournament Bracket

Tournament
Ohio Valley Conference men's basketball tournament
Ohio Valley Conference men's basketball tournament
Ohio Valley Conference men's basketball tournament
Basketball competitions in Nashville, Tennessee
College sports tournaments in Tennessee